Willie Chambers (born March 3, 1938) is a singer, guitarist, and former member of The Chambers Brothers, a rock band in the 1960s with hits "In The Midnight Hour", "I Can't Turn You Loose", and "Time Has Come Today". He continues to be a regular attraction at various venues in Los Angeles and further afield.

Background
Along with brothers Lester, Joe and George, Willie was a founding member of The Chambers Brothers and stayed with them through their evolution which included the addition of drummer Brian Keenan in 1965 and the group's eventual breakup. He sang lead on one of their hits, a cover of Wilson Pickett's "In The Midnight Hour". He also co-wrote their biggest hit "Time Has Come Today" with his brother Joe. He would later work as a session musician. More recently, he has become more active and has collaborated with artists such as Louis Metoyer.  He has also been involved with Australian born artists such as Jessie Sparks and singer Stephen Rowe, appearing in his "Restless Soul" video.

He had a business relationship with publicist Beverly Noga. Acts she had represented included Sonny & Cher, Cream, the Bee Gees and The Chambers Brothers. After her 1964 founded company, Contemporary Public Relations closed down, she and Willie Chambers formed Hebewillen Enterprises and Hebewillen Publishing which ran until her death in 2021.

Career

1960s to 1980s
During the 1960s, Willie was worried about he and his brothers with performing political songs with Barbara Dane. Years later he said "You can’t do music and politics. It’s like gasoline and water. It doesn’t mix.".

In a review of the Live in Concert on Mars album by The Chambers Brothers which featured Steve Cropper, Willie's singing on the song "Superstar" was referred to as a gem with the reviewer also saying that 7:37 wouldn't be too long for progressive airplay.

Willie and brother Joe provided backing vocals on "Haunted House", a track on the Before The Rain album by Lee Oskar, released in 1978.

1990s to 2000s
Chambers added his vocals to a track on Kid Ramos' self-titled album. Mike Boehm of Los Angeles Times gave a review in September 1999. He noted Chambers' input to the song "Leave Me Alone", describing it as "piercing, full-on cries in the role of a man caged in a romance he doesn’t want". In 2005, he sang lead on  "I Move Easy" which was written by T. J. Tindall and featured Tindal, Earl Scooter on background vocals. The rhythm section featured Earl Young and Ronnie Baker and Larry Washington from MFSB.

In 2006, he sat in with a group called Vince and the Invinceables at a benefit concert for Arthur Lee of the group Love.

Between 2008 and 2009, he was involved with the Artie Vegas Revue.
He and his brother Joe Chambers worked with Australian singer Jessie Sparks. They contributed to the song "Calendar Years" which featured on her EP which was released in 2012. The song was described as a funky piece with a soulful vocal. In September 2015, Chambers and Louis Metoyer were scheduled to appear at Pickwick Gardens, Ronnie Mack's Salute to Tina Turner event.

Collaboration with Louis Metoyer
In addition to Chambers and Metoyer working on various projects such as appearing at the Pickwick Gardens Turner event and performing with the Madero Sisters, they recorded "Get Out And Vote!!!" which was released in 2018.

2020s
Chambers had worked with group Trans-X and worked on two dance collaborations, "She Freaks out on the Floor" in 2018 and "Keep it Coming" in 2020.

On October 17, 2022, Chambers and Barbara Dane who the Chambers Bro's worked with in the mid-60s performed together live on stage in Berkley singing, "Ain't Gonna Let Nobody Turn Me Around". In November, 2022 Chambers was interviewed for the Psychedelic Scene YouTube channel. It was also published on line in transcript form.

Discography (selective)

Film and guest appearances
 Restless Soul (Video)
 The making of "Restless Soul" video
 South Central Gospel - Documentary - 2011 - Himself

References

External links
 DOLA  - Willie Chambers
 Second Hand Songs - Willie Chambers

Music
 tangible-technology.com, 21-08-2005 - "I Move Easy," written by TJ Tindall and sung by Willie Chambers
 Michael Donnelly YouTube channel - Barbara Dane & Willie Chambers "Ain't Gonna Let Nobody Turn Me Around" live, Berkeley, Oct 17, 2022
 Michael Donnelly YouTube channel - Willie Chambers "I Was Born To Sing The Blues" live, Berkeley, Oct 17, 2022

Interviews
 Prihod Productions, Apr 29, 2015 - LARocks TV interviews Willie Chambers
 Tom Meros YouTube Channel, November 1, 2019 - The Chambers Brothers - Willie Chambers tells Tom about their history
 NAMM Oral History Library (2020) - Willie Chambers Interview 
 Kevin Grace YouTube Channel, Mar 18, 2022 - Willie Chambers of The Chambers Brothers Interview (Mar 12, 2022)
 Psychedelic Scene channel, Nov 17, 2022 - Willie Chambers Interview with Psychedelic Scene
 Psychedelic Scene Magazine, November 17, 2022- INTERVIEW: WILLIE CHAMBERS OF THE CHAMBERS BROTHERS by Jason LeValley

1938 births
Living people
American male singers
The Chambers Brothers members
Guitarists from Mississippi
20th-century American guitarists
American male guitarists
20th-century American male musicians